Santa Rosa is a city in and the county seat of Guadalupe County, New Mexico, United States. The population was 2,848 at the 2010 census. It lies between Albuquerque and Tucumcari, situated on the Pecos River at the intersection of Interstate 40 and U.S. Route 54 and 84. The city is located on the western edge of the Llano Estacado or "staked plains" of eastern New Mexico and west Texas.

History
The first Euro-American settlement in the area was Agua Negra Chiquita, "Little Black Water" in Spanish, in 1865. The name was changed in 1890 to Santa Rosa (Spanish for "Saint Rose"), referring to a chapel that Don Celso Baca (the founder of the city) built and named after both his mother Rosa and Saint Rose of Lima. The "Rosa" may also refer to the roses in the story of Our Lady of Guadalupe and is indicative of the Catholicism of the Spanish colonizers who settled in the area.

At the turn of the twentieth century, Santa Rosa was not the largest settlement within the region. Puerto de Luna, approximately ten miles south, held the county seat for Guadalupe County. Santa Rosa was smaller than Puerto de Luna until 1901 when the Chicago, Rock Island & Pacific Railroad was built into Santa Rosa from the east, quickly followed by arrival of the El Paso and Northeastern Railway in February 1902, from the southwest, thereby creating a transcontinental connection. As the terminus and interchange point of the two railroads, a thriving community quickly developed (The interchange was moved to Tucumcari after 1907). The county seat was moved to Santa Rosa from PDL in 1903.

The east-west highway through the town was designated as U.S. Route 66 in 1926, and the increase in traffic made the community a popular rest stop with motels and cafes. Santa Rosa's stretch of Route 66 is part of film history. When John Steinbeck's epic novel, The Grapes of Wrath, was made into a movie, director John Ford used Santa Rosa for the memorable train scene. Tom Joad (Henry Fonda) watches a freight train steam over the Pecos River railroad bridge, into the sunset. It was also one of the shooting scenes for Bobbie Jo and the Outlaw starring Lynda Carter in the role of Bobbi Jo.

Santa Rosa was the childhood home of author Rudolfo Anaya, and is the basis for the fictional town of Guadalupe in his autobiographical novel Bless Me, Ultima.

Geography
Santa Rosa has many natural lakes, an anomaly in the dry desert climate surrounding it. These are sinkholes that form in the limestone bedrock of the area and fill with water, and thus the lakes are connected by a network of underground, water-filled tunnels.

Santa Rosa is located near the center of Guadalupe County at  (34.942166, -104.683981).

Climate
Santa Rosa experiences a semi-arid climate (Köppen climate classification BSk).

Transport

Highways
Interstate 40 serves the city with three exits (273, 275, and 277); the highway leads east  to Tucumcari and west  to Albuquerque. U.S. Route 84 leads southeast  to Fort Sumner, and U.S. Route 54 leads southwest  to Vaughn. 

"Route 66" remains the name of the main east-west thoroughfare through the city, referring to former U.S. Route 66, which lost its official designation in 1985.

New Mexico State Road 91 runs south to Puerto de Luna.

Railroad
Union Pacific provides freight service. No passenger service has been available since 1968.

Airport
Santa Rosa Route 66 Airport is located east of the city. Currently there is no scheduled passenger service.

Demographics

As of the census of 2000, there were 2,744 people, 898 households, and 616 families residing in the city. The population density was 645.7 people per square mile (249.3/km). There were 1,024 housing units at an average density of 241.0 per square mile (93.0/km). The racial makeup of the city was 57.47% White, 2.19% African American, 1.75% Native American, 0.87% Asian, 0.04% Pacific Islander, 33.13% from other races, and 4.56% from two or more races. Hispanic or Latino of any race were 81.16% of the population.

There were 898 households, out of which 35.0% had children under the age of 18 living with them, 45.1% were married couples living together, 18.3% had a female householder with no husband present, and 31.3% were non-families. 28.0% of all households were made up of individuals, and 11.2% had someone living alone who was 65 years of age or older. The average household size was 2.50 and the average family size was 3.03.

In the city, the population was spread out, with 23.1% under the age of 18, 10.4% from 18 to 24, 34.4% from 25 to 44, 20.0% from 45 to 64, and 12.0% who were 65 years of age or older. The median age was 36 years. For every 100 females, there were 135.1 males. For every 100 females age 18 and over, there were 145.2 males.

The median income for a household in the city was $25,085, and the median income for a family was $28,782. Males had a median income of $20,161 versus $16,417 for females. The per capita income for the city was $11,168. About 18.9% of families and 23.2% of the population were below the poverty line, including 27.5% of those under age 18 and 23.9% of those age 65 or over.

Education
Its school district is Santa Rosa Consolidated Schools. It operates Santa Rosa Elementary School, Santa Rosa Middle School, and Santa Rosa High School.

Sports
Santa Rosa High School's football team won back-to-back-to-back state championships in the 2010, 2011, and 2012 AA state championships. The 2010 and 2011 victories were won against teams which were undefeated until the championship. In 2010 the Santa Rosa Lions beat the Tularosa Wildcats, and in 2011 the Santa Rosa Lions beat the Eunice Cardinals. In 2012, the Santa Rosa Lions went undefeated, shutting out the Tularosa Wildcats in the championship. The Lions also won championships in 1955, 1993, 1996, 1998, and 2007. Santa Rosa High School was also among the first in the country to establish a lawn mower racing club.

Notable people 

 Anarquia, professional wrestler
 Rudolfo Anaya, author known for Bless Me, Ultima
 Charles E. Barnhart, attorney and politician
 Dave Campos, motorcycle racer
 Joe A. Campos, former member of the New Mexico House of Representatives
 Santiago E. Campos, attorney and jurist
 George Dodge, former member of the New Mexico House of Representatives
 Miguel Marquez, national correspondent for CNN
 Lucy Scarbrough, noted pianist, conductor, and educator.

References

Further reading
 Wiley, Olive Smith (1973). - A Santa Rosa Story. -

External links

 City of Santa Rosa official website
 Santa Rosa Blue Hole official website
 New Mexico True: Santa Rosa

 
Cities in Guadalupe County, New Mexico
Cities in New Mexico
County seats in New Mexico
1865 establishments in New Mexico Territory